Tama Hochbaum (born 1953) is an artist and photographer living in Chapel Hill, North Carolina.

Life
Hochbaum was born in New York City, and  received her BA from Brandeis University in Fine Arts. Upon graduation, she was awarded a Thomas J. Watson Foundation Fellowship to study printmaking at Atelier 17 in Paris. She later received a MFA in painting from Queens College in NYC in 1981.

She worked as a painter in Newton, Massachusetts for 20 years.

In 1991, during a four-month stay in Italy, an old interest in photography that had begun during her time in Paris re-emerged.

In 1996, she and her family moved to North Carolina, where she currently lives.

Process
Hochbaum has been interested in making work about the passage of time. Her recent work is a portfolio of self-portraits titled "Anti-Selfies". In her artist statement about this work she states:

The self-portrait is, by its very nature, linked to the artist’s identity. She insists on her relevance, her existence even, through her representation of the self. In “Anti-Selfies” I present myself to the viewer with my signifiers – my red glasses and pink lipstick. To create the first layer in these works, the fundamental self-portrait, I capture my face in a grid of nine parts, three rows of three. The second, superimposed layer, also gridded, has anywhere from 9 to 841 parts. These images are screen shots from what has become my camera of choice, my iPhone.

Most of these digital composite images live in two dimensions. Instead of a deep, perspectival space, these images flatten out and parade across the surface of the picture plane as mosaics. This compositional device generates a tension in the play between fragmentation and cohesion, between seeing the portrait as a whole and separating the layers, hence seeing the many discrete images, “reading” them individually, in sequence, like text.

Jason Farago, in his New York Times essay on Albrecht Dürer’s 1500 self-portrait, implies that the artist presents “the self as a subjective individual, the author of one’s own life story.” This resonates deeply with what I am creating in this series. My gridded constructions are, in essence, anti-selfies. While the ‘sitter’ in those ubiquitous images that appear everywhere on social media is prominent, center-stage, my visage is obscured, sometimes practically consumed by what surrounds or lays on top of it. In contrast to the quick, casual, spontaneous selfie, my self-portraits are deliberate, formal, fabricated, staged composites combining, blending, and superimposing a variety of images: flowers, beloved objects,  Zelensky, exhibitions I have seen, my home, my ancestors, my progeny and my self. These self-portraits are consciously self-centered; they are considered, vibrant, multi-layered creations that state, “I am here, and this is my story”.

Hochbaum's previous body of work consisted of composite photo collages, in black and white and color. In these pieces, she begins with a grid of between 25 and 50 photos set up in columns and rows and works digitally to blend the individual panels to make a whole, a single picture plane. She always leaves a hint of fog at the border between the modules, never making a seamless image, to remind the viewer that this is no window one is looking through, this is the act of seeing itself, over time.

Previous to this portfolio, Hochbaum created shaped images, made up of individual panels printed into aluminum. She has used three distinct shapes - the symmetrical cross, the lintel or doorway and the Bi square, the empty square, or the squaring off of the Bi disc shape.  She has also produced a series on the Silver Screen. In this series, Hochbaum takes screenshots of classic movies broadcast on TV, warping images of famous Hollywood starlets (Audrey Hepburn, Greta Garbo and Lillian Gish among them) before printing the image on aluminum panels. She has published a book with Daylight Books of the same name, SILVER SCREEN. Along with these series, she has created a number of slide shows to music; each contain hundreds of her images. Two of these pieces were commissioned by the University of North Carolina at Chapel Hill. One, Graffito, a collaboration with her husband the composer Allen Anderson, was screened in Memorial Hall in February 2011 as part of the North Carolina Digital Arts Festival. Another, return:radius, was screened at the FedEx Global Education Center as part of the Water of Life Festival in the Spring of 2013.

She was represented by George Lawson Gallery in San Francisco and Los Angeles for 9 years.
Her work is in the collections of the Museum of Fine Arts, Boston and the Benton Museum in Storrs, Connecticut. 
Her work is also in the corporate collections of Credit Suisse and Truist Bank.

Collections
Hochbaum's work is held in the following public collections:
Museum of Fine Arts, Boston
William Benton Museum of Art at the University of Connecticut in Storrs, CT
Credit Suisse

References

External links

1953 births
Living people
Artists from New York City
Artists from North Carolina
Atelier 17 alumni
Photographers from North Carolina
Artists from Newton, Massachusetts
20th-century American photographers
21st-century American photographers
20th-century American women photographers
21st-century American women photographers